Charles Augustus Arrobio (July 9, 1944 – March 18, 2018) was an American football tackle who played for the USC Trojans and the Minnesota Vikings.

References

1944 births
2018 deaths
American football tackles
USC Trojans football players
Minnesota Vikings players
Players of American football from Los Angeles
Glendale High School (Glendale, California) alumni